The Loch of Kirbister  is a small, shallow, somewhat triangular shaped loch on Mainland Orkney, Scotland, in the parish of Orphir. There is a small ( by ) turf-covered islet known as the Groundwater of Holm just off the eastern shore of the loch. It shows traces in stone of an oval structure and small projecting pier. The loch is popular for trout fishing and the Orkney Trout Fishing Association has a hatchery at the Kirbister pumphouse  on the loch edge.

Mill Burn, the southerly outflow from the loch, was used to power the 18th century Kirbister Mill.

The loch was surveyed in 1903 by T.N. Johnston and R.C. Marshall and later charted  as part of Sir John Murray's The Bathymetrical Survey of Fresh-Water Lochs of Scotland 1897-1909.

References

Kirbister
Kirbister
Kirbister
Mainland, Orkney